Baimurat Allaberiyev (born 20 February 1971) also known as Tajik Jimmy, is a vocalist and musician from Tajikistan of Uzbek ethnic origin. He was discovered while working in a warehouse as a result of a colleague recording him performing a cover of "Jimmy Jimmy Jimmy Aaja" from the Bollywood movie "Disco Dancer" with a cell phone and posting it on the internet. Since that time, he has moved to St. Petersburg and performed there and elsewhere in Russia in theaters and night clubs.

He has appeared in the successful Russian comedy films Yolki, Yolki 3, Yolki 5 and New Husband.

References 
 News report on Tajik Jimmy's success in 2009
 Performing 'Soviet' Film Classics: Tajik Jimmy and the Aural Remnants of Indian Cinema." Studies in Russian and Soviet Cinema 7.2 (2013): 227-242 by Andrew Chapman, University of Texas at San Antonio, Lead Editor of Digital Icons: Studies in Russian, Eurasian and Central European New Media

External links
YouTube clip of Baimurat performing "Jimmy Aaja"
YouTube clip of Baimurat performing the song "Goron"

Tajikistani people of Uzbek descent
21st-century Tajikistani male singers
Living people
1971 births